Jang Baek-Gyu (born 9 October 1991) is a South Korean footballer who plays as forward for Bucheon FC in K League 2.

Career
He was selected by Daegu FC in the 2014 K League draft.

References

External links 

1991 births
Living people
Association football forwards
South Korean footballers
Daegu FC players
Chungju Hummel FC players
Bucheon FC 1995 players
K League 2 players
Korea National League players